Likhaya Pozhnya is a rural locality (a village) in Gorod Vyazniki, Vyaznikovsky District, Vladimir Oblast, Russia. The population was 81 as of 2010. There are 3 streets.

Geography 
Likhaya Pozhnya is located on the Suvoroshch River, 15 km west of Vyazniki (the district's administrative centre) by road. Korshunikha is the nearest rural locality.

References 

Rural localities in Vyaznikovsky District